Thomas Jefferson York (July 13, 1850 – February 17, 1936) was a professional baseball left fielder. Over the course of York's 15-season career as a professional, which spanned the National Association and Major League Baseball, he racked up 1095 hits in 4005 at bats, for a .273 batting average. Twice, during his playing time with the Providence Grays, he was also manager including the entire first season of the team's existence in 1878.

York began his playing career in the amateur National Association of Base Ball Players with the Powhatan club in Brooklyn in 1869. In 1871, he became a member of the Troy Haymakers, one of the founding clubs of the National Association. He was playing for the Hartford Dark Blues when they joined the new National League in 1876.

In 1878, after the Hartfords folded, York joined the Providence Grays as player-manager. That season, he led the National League in total bases, extra-base hits, and triples. He was a member of the National League champion Grays team of 1879, and remained with the team until 1882. In 1883, now a member of the Cleveland Blues he led the league in walks. After one season with the Blues, he was purchased by the Baltimore Orioles of the American Association. He played two seasons for Baltimore to finish out his major league career.

Tom died at the age of 86 in New York City, and was buried in Holy Cross Cemetery, which is in Brooklyn.

See also
 List of Major League Baseball annual triples leaders
 List of Major League Baseball player-managers

Notes

References 

Major League Baseball left fielders
Troy Haymakers (NABBP) players
Troy Haymakers players
Baltimore Canaries players
Philadelphia White Stockings players
Hartford Dark Blues players
Providence Grays players
Cleveland Blues (NL) players
Baltimore Orioles (AA) players
Providence Grays managers
Major League Baseball player-managers
Cleveland Forest Cities players
Minor league baseball managers
Baseball players from New York (state)
Sportspeople from Brooklyn
Baseball players from New York City
19th-century baseball players
1850 births
1936 deaths
Burials at Holy Cross Cemetery, Brooklyn
People from Brooklyn